Pontiac is Lyle Lovett's second studio album, released in 1987.

Chart performance 
Pontiac reached number 12 on Billboard's chart for Top Country Albums, and 117 on the Billboard Hot 200.

Critical reception 

Pontiac was ranked at 201 in the list of the "500 Best Albums of All-Time" by the German edition of Rolling Stone in 2004.  The album was cited as one of the top 100 albums of the 1980s by the Italian magazines Il Mucchio Selvaggio  and Velvet.  It is also one of 300 albums listed in the book 50 Years of Great Recordings, and appeared at number 33 on the Village Voice's list of top albums of 1988.

Track listing 
All songs written by Lyle Lovett
 "If I Had a Boat" – 3:06
 "Give Back My Heart" – 3:00
 "I Loved You Yesterday" – 2:56
 "Walk Through the Bottomland" – 4:11
 "L.A. County" – 3:17
 "She's No Lady" – 3:13
 "M-O-N-E-Y" – 3:15
 "Black and Blue" – 3:58
 "Simple Song" – 3:17
 "Pontiac" – 2:24
 "She's Hot to Go" – 2:30

Personnel 
Tony Brown –	producer
Paul Franklin –	steel guitar
Vince Gill –	guitar, background vocals (track 2)
John Hagen –	cello
Emmylou Harris –	background Vocals (track 4)
Ray Herndon –	electric guitar
Simon Levy –	art direction
Lyle Lovett –	acoustic guitar, vocals, producer
Steve Marsh –	saxophone
Matt McKenzie –	electric bass 
Glenn Meadows –	mastering
Edgar Meyer – double bass
Peter Nash –	photography
Willie Pevear –	engineer
Francine Reed –	background vocals (tracks 2, 7, & 11)
Matt Rollings –	piano, DX-7 synthesizer
J. David Sloan –	background vocals
Harry Stinson –	drums, background Vocals
Steve Tillisch –	engineer, mixing
Ron Treat –	engineer
Billy Williams –	acoustic & rhythm guitar, associate producer
Marty Williams –	second engineer

Chart performance

Notes and sources 

1987 albums
Lyle Lovett albums
Albums produced by Tony Brown (record producer)
Curb Records albums
MCA Records albums